Sebastopol was the name of a large artillery mortar commissioned by the Ethiopian emperor Tewodros II. The name was taken from the Crimean town Sevastopol, the site of a battle during the Crimean War. The mortar weighed approximately 6.7 tons, and was capable of firing off half-ton artillery rounds.

Tewodros, in an attempt to speed up industrialization in Ethiopia, took some British officials and German missionaries hostage to coerce technological help out of the United Kingdom. Instead the British government mounted an expedition to free the captives, which resulted in the Battle of Magdala. Tewodros ordered the mortar to be hauled up to his fortress capital, but it was too heavy.

Although there are no records of the mortar being used in the battle it remains half-buried in the ground, on the plateau at Meqedela, near Amba Mariam. A bronze replica has been cast and displayed in the centre of a roundabout at Tewodros Square, Churchill Avenue, Addis Ababa.

References

Mortars
Military history of Ethiopia
Weapons of Ethiopia
Weapons and ammunition introduced in 1868